Karjaküla is a small borough in Lääne-Harju Parish, Harju County, northern Estonia. It has a population of 387 (as of 1 January 2004).

Russian military leader Ivan Gannibal (1735–1801), was born in Karjaküla Manor.

References

External links
Lääne-Harju Parish 

Boroughs and small boroughs in Estonia